Conognatha splendens is a species of beetles in the family Buprestidae.

Description
The basic color is metallic blue-green, with a transversal orange band on the elytra.

References

Buprestidae
Beetles described in 1912